Winterthur railway station is the principal railway station of Winterthur, in the Swiss canton of Zürich. The station is listed on the Swiss Inventory of Cultural Property of National Significance.

Winterthur is Switzerland's fifth busiest station, and is a major node between Switzerland's largest railway nucleus in Zürich and places in Eastern Switzerland (such as St. Gallen and Schaffhausen), as well as Germany (Munich), and Austria (Vorarlberg). The station is served by trains on Zürich's suburban S-Bahn network, as well as by regional and intercity trains, with all through passenger trains making a stop. It is directly linked to Zürich Flughafen – Zurich Airport's railway station – within 15 minutes travelling time seven times per hour. Zürich Hauptbahnhof can be reached with up to 16 direct connections per hour, the fastest of which takes 22 minutes. The station has five standard-gauge platforms serving nine tracks and is the central node of the local STADTBUS Winterthur network and regional bus services (e.g. PostBus Switzerland). All public transport in and around Winterthur is part of the canton of Zürich's integrated fare network ZVV.

Location
Bahnhof Winterthur is centrally located, at the northwestern edge of the city centre.

History
In 1855, the first temporary station building was built in Winterthur as a timber framed structure. The design of the building was by A. Beck, who also managed the construction. The building was sold in 1860 to the City of Zurich, which wanted to move and rebuild it in the vicinity of the Kornhaus. Most likely, it was used for the construction of the Kornhauswirtschaft, as these two buildings bear a very great resemblance.

Five years after the opening of the provisional building, the first real station was built, under the direction of the architect Jakob Friedrich Wanner, who, together with A. Beck, was responsible for the design. The builder, Meier, came from Winterthur, and the train shed was built by the firm Benkiser of Pforzheim. In 1875, its first expansion was completed, to coincide with the commencement of the Winterthur operations of the Tösstalbahn and the Nationalbahn. This expansion consisted of an extension to each side of the station building equal to the width of four window bays, in order to create space for new waiting rooms.

Further renovations in 1894−96 left the station building in its present form. These renovations, proposed by the architect Ernst Jung and Otto Bridler, produced a station building in Renaissance style; the Federal Palace of Switzerland served as a template.

In 1944, the present day tracks 8 and 9 were added. In 1980, the station was again extended by two tracks (the current platforms 1 and 2), which were used for the Tösstal line and for postal trains. Today, S-Bahn trains to Wil depart from the Postal train track.

In 1988, the two-storey parking deck was built over the station yard. In 2000 followed the construction of the Stadttor Winterthur between the station building and the EPA department store, which is now a Coop City department store.

The term Hauptbahnhof or HB (for main railway station) is no longer used by Swiss Federal Railways (SBB CFF FFS), the station's owner and operator, but is still sometimes used colloquially. Although the station's name appears simply as Winterthur on the station signs and on schedule information, the name Hauptbahnhof is still used for the bus stop in front of the station.

Layout 
Winterthur is a through station with five platforms and nine tracks. Tracks 1 and 2 terminate on the east side of the station, while the remaining tracks run through. The platform nearest the station is a side platform serving track 1 only, while the next nearest platform faces both the terminating track 2 and the through-running track 3. This arrangement is similar to a bay platform; platforms that a physically adjacent to station building are called . Three island platforms serve tracks 4–9.

In front of the station, on the line towards Zurich, is the former goods station. It was closed in 1995–1996, and serves today only for the storage of trains. As a replacement for the closed structure, a maintenance facility was built at the Oberwinterthur railway station.

Services 
 the following services stop at Winterthur: On weekends, there are also six nighttime S-Bahn services (SN1, SN3, SN6, SN41, two SN) offered by ZVV.

 : service every two hours between Zürich Hauptbahnhof and München Hauptbahnhof.
 InterCity:
 InterRegio:
 Zürich S-Bahn:
 : half-hourly service to  via Zürich Hauptbahnhof.
 : peak-hour service between Zürich main station and  via .
 : hourly service to Weinfelden (combined with the S24 for half-hourly service).
 : hourly service to Schaffhausen (combined with the S12 and S24 for service every 20 minutes).
 : hourly service to Wil (combined with the S12 for half-hourly service).
 Nighttime S-Bahn (only during weekends):

Urban public transport 

Winterthur Hauptbahnhof or HB is the central bus station of the local STADTBUS Winterthur bus operator and therefore also the most important hub of the Winterthur trolleybus system. All but two of the city bus lines stop at the Hauptbahnhof. Additionally, the regional Stadtbus lines, along with PostAuto lines, all stop there. Only the lines that serve Wiesendangen and a few villages northeast of Winterthur depart from Oberwinterthur station instead. The Winterthur bus station is the largest in the canton of Zurich.

Stadtbus Winterthur 

Lines 1–3 are trolleybus lines. The remaining lines are operated exclusively by low-floor buses. Normally, articulated buses run on lines 5, 7 and 14. On the remaining lines, conventional (rigid chassis) buses provide the services.

Regional lines 
The yellow numbers are PostAuto lines, and the blue numbers are city bus lines. However, lines 665/670 are served by both PostAuto buses and city buses.

Nighttime buses 
Several nighttime bus lines are operated hourly on Friday to Saturday and Saturday to Sunday from 01:30 to 04:30. As the last regular buses usually depart from HB at 0.50 and the first such buses start running again from 05:30, one can therefore speak of a continuously operating network when the nighttime buses are running.

The nighttime buses operate on the following lines, but only outwards; there are no return services.

Panorama

See also 

History of rail transport in Switzerland
Rail transport in Switzerland
Trams in Winterthur

References

Cited works

External links 

 
 Interactive station plan (Winterthur)

Railway stations in the canton of Zürich
Swiss Federal Railways stations
Transport in Winterthur
Cultural property of national significance in the canton of Zürich
Railway stations in Switzerland opened in 1855